Allodamaeus ewingi is a species of oribatid in the family Plateremaeidae.

References

Acariformes